Blaž Emeršič (born October 10, 1980 in Ljubljana) is a Slovenian ice hockey player currently playing for Milton Keynes Lightning of the English Premier Ice Hockey League.

He began his career with Olimpija Ljubljana before moving to North America in 1999. He went to play for teams in the Central Hockey League, the ECHL and the American Hockey League.

Emeršič moved to the United Kingdom in 2005, signing for the Elite League's Nottingham Panthers. On November 5, 2005, in an Elite League match against the London Racers, he received severe facial injuries after being checked into the side of the rink. He made a full recovery and continued to play for the Panthers until moving to the Slough Jets in 2006. In January 2010 after a disagreement with the Slough Jets management he accepted an offer from league champions Milton Keynes Lightning for the rest of the 2009/10 season. In June 2011 he signed a further 1-season extension with Milton Keynes for the 2011/12 season.

Career statistics 
Regular season and playoffs

International

References

External links 

1980 births
Living people
Sportspeople from Ljubljana
Slovenian ice hockey forwards
Arkansas RiverBlades players
Charlotte Checkers (1993–2010) players
Greenville Grrrowl players
HDD Olimpija Ljubljana players
Indianapolis Ice players
Nottingham Panthers players
Milton Keynes Lightning players
Peoria Rivermen (ECHL) players
Rio Grande Valley Killer Bees players
Utah Grizzlies (AHL) players
Wichita Thunder players
Slough Jets players